Arturo Delgado (born 17 November 1951) is a Mexican boxer. He competed in the men's flyweight event at the 1972 Summer Olympics, in Munich, West Germany.

References

External links
 
 

1951 births
Living people
Mexican male boxers
Olympic boxers of Mexico
Boxers at the 1972 Summer Olympics
Boxers at the 1971 Pan American Games
Pan American Games medalists in boxing
Pan American Games silver medalists for Mexico
Place of birth missing (living people)
Flyweight boxers
Medalists at the 1971 Pan American Games
20th-century Mexican people
21st-century Mexican people